Weyerhaeuser Company v. Ross-Simmons Hardwood Lumber Company, 549 U.S. 312 (2007), was a United States Supreme Court case related to antitrust regulations.

Background 
Both parties operated sawmills; Ross-Simmons was driven out of business by what it complained was Weyerhaeuser's attempted monopsonization of the market. The theory was "predatory buying": a purchaser buys so much of a given raw material that it drives up the price and thereby excludes less pecunious rivals who depend on the same raw material.

Opinion of the Court 
The Supreme Court rejected the theory on a rule of reason analysis, noting that there are any number of legitimate business strategies that involve buying large quantities of raw materials. A plaintiff alleging predatory buying must therefore prove—and Ross-Simmons had not—that the defendant caused the price to rise, and that the defendant is likely to recoup the costs incurred in such a scheme. 

The Court's decision symmetrized its case law, with Weyerhaeuser and Brooke Group Ltd. v. Brown & Williamson Tobacco Corp. applying identical standards to predatory buying and predatory selling claims respectively.

External links
 

United States Supreme Court cases
United States antitrust case law
2007 in United States case law
Weyerhaeuser
United States Supreme Court cases of the Roberts Court